The 2022 Eastern Illinois Panthers football team represents Eastern Illinois University as a member of the Ohio Valley Conference (OVC) during the 2022 NCAA Division I FCS football season. The Panthers are led by first-year head coach Chris Wilkerson and play home games at O'Brien Field in Charleston, Illinois.

Previous season

The Panthers finished the 2021 season 1–10, 1–5 in OVC play to finish in a tie for last place. On January 11, 2022 Adam Cushing has resigned and accept the offensive line position at Duke. Chris Wilkerson was named head coach at Eastern Illinois.

Preseason

Preseason coaches' poll
The OVC released their preseason coaches' poll on July 19, 2022. The Panthers were picked to finish in second to last place.

Preseason All-OVC team
The Panthers had six players selected to the preseason all-OVC team.

Offense

Isaiah Hill – WR
Jay Vallie — TE

Defense

Jordan Miles – DE
Tim Varga — DE
Russell Dandy — CB
Jordan Vincent — NB

Schedule

Source:

Game summaries

at Northern Illinois

No. 11 Chattanooga

at Illinois State

Murray State

Northwestern State

Lindenwood

at Tennessee State

Tennessee Tech

at McNeese State

No. 20 Southeast Missouri State

at No. 25 UT Martin

References

Eastern Illinois
Eastern Illinois Panthers football seasons
Eastern Illinois Panthers football